Newa Talai is a census town in Udaipur district in the Indian state of Rajasthan.

Demographics
 India census, Newa Talai had a population of 4669. Males constitute 53% of the population and females 47%. Newa Talai has an average literacy rate of 69%, higher than the national average of 59.5%: male literacy is 78%, and female literacy is 58%. In Newa Talai, 13% of the population is under 6 years of age.

References

Cities and towns in Udaipur district